The Kolkata–Sitamarhi Express is an Express train belonging to Eastern Railway zone that runs between  and  in India. It is currently being operated with 13165/13166 train numbers on a weekly basis.

Service

Route and halts 

The important halts of the train are:

Coach composition

The train has standard ICF rakes with max speed of 110 kmph. The train consists of 16 coaches:

 2 AC III Tier
 6 Sleeper coaches
 6 General
 2 Seating cum Luggage Rake

Traction

Both trains are hauled by an Asansol Loco Shed-based WAP-4 electric locomotive from Kolkata to Samastipur. From Samastipur it is hauled by a Samastipur Loco Shed-based WDP 4 diesel locomotive up till Ghazipur, and vice versa.

Rake sharing

The trains shares its rake with

 13157/13158 Tirhut Express
 13159/13160 Kolkata–Jogbani Express
 13155/13156 Mithilanchal Express

See also 

 Kolkata railway station
 Sitamarhi Junction railway station
 Mithilanchal Express

Notes

References

External links 

 13165/Kolkata–Sitamarhi Express
 13166/Sitamarhi–Kolkata Express

Transport in Kolkata
Transport in Sitamarhi
Express trains in India
Rail transport in West Bengal
Rail transport in Jharkhand
Rail transport in Bihar
Railway services introduced in 2013